100 West Washington is a high-rise skyscraper in Downtown Phoenix, Arizona, United States. 

Formerly known as Wells Fargo Plaza, it opened as the First National Bank Plaza on October 25, 1971 and was later known as the First Interstate Bank Building. It is 356 feet (109 m) tall. It is designed in the Brutalist style, an architectural style spawned from the International Style. The “raw concrete” element of Brutalist architecture allows for no exterior finish which exposes the rough concrete columns and beams.

The tower was designed by the Phoenix office of Charles Luckman and Associates and constructed by the Henry C. Beck Company.

The tower sits on a base three stories high, then rises to its full height. The repetitive angular windows add another Brutalist element of blocky appearance and expression of structure.

The Wells Fargo History Museum was located on the first floor, but closed in 2020. Exhibits included an extensive collection of western-themed art depicting Wells Fargo's role in the mines of Arizona, a 19th-century stagecoach, telegraph equipment and minerals.

After anchor tenant Wells Fargo departed for its suburban campus located in nearby Chandler, the Phoenix City Council voted in July 2021 to purchase the building for $46.5 million. The primary motivation at the time was to relocate the City's 911 operations and other city departments as needed. The large yellow Wells Fargo logo that had adorned the building's north and south facades for years was removed in late 2021, reflecting the change in ownership. 

In June 2022, the City of Phoenix began soliciting bids to relocate the Phoenix Police Department to the tower at an estimated renovation cost of $90 million.  No other city departments are programmed for the building.

References

External links

 http://www.wellsfargohistory.com/museums/museums_ph.htm
 Emporis.com
 http://www.coppersquare.com

Skyscraper office buildings in Phoenix, Arizona
Office buildings completed in 1971
Wells Fargo buildings
Bank buildings in Arizona
Charles Luckman buildings
1971 establishments in Arizona